David Andrews may refer to:
Entertainment
 David Andrews (actor) (born 1952), American actor
 David Andrews (director) (born 1935), British former actor and television director
 David Andrews, Jr. (born 1966), Irish comedian known by the pseudonym David McSavage
 Dave Andrews (activist) (born 1951), Australian Christian author and speaker
 Dave Andrews (musician) (born 1972), English musician and composer of film music

Sports
 David Andrews (American football) (born 1992), American offensive lineman for the New England Patriots
 David Andrews (ice hockey) (born 1948), former President and CEO, American Hockey League
 David Andrews (racing driver) (born 1939), British former racing driver

Other
 A. David Andrews (born 1933), English astronomer
 David Andrews (diplomat) (born 1952), Australian diplomat and writer under the pseudonym David Morriset
 David Andrews (politician) (born 1935), Irish Fianna Fáil politician and barrister
 David W. Andrews, American academic and president of National University

See also
 David Andrew (1867–1928), Australian politician